Goodnight Mommy (UK: Goodnight Mummy) is a 2014 Austrian psychological horror film, written and directed by Veronika Franz and Severin Fiala. The film stars Susanne Wuest and twin actors Elias and Lukas Schwarz, and follows the complex relationship between twin boys and their newly-returned-from-the-hospital mother in a large isolated house. The boys begin to question the woman's identity, believing that she isn't the same person as the one who went to surgery, and therefore wondering if she is their real mother.

Goodnight Mommy had its world premiere at the 71st Venice International Film Festival on 30 August 2014 and was theatrically released on 5 January 2015, by Stadtkino Verleih. The film grossed $2 million worldwide and received generally positive reviews from critics, with praise for its performances, direction and screenplay. It was selected as the Austrian entry for the Best Foreign Language Film at the 88th Academy Awards, but it was not nominated.

An American remake of the film starring Naomi Watts was released on Amazon Prime Video on September 16, 2022.

Plot
After undergoing cosmetic facial surgery, a mother (Susanne Wuest) comes back home to her modern, isolated lakeside house and her ten-year-old twins, Elias and Lukas (Elias and Lukas Schwarz). Her head is swathed in bandages, with only her eyes and mouth visible. The twins are unnerved with their mother's appearance and are further taken aback when she begins to exhibit strange behavior. She pointedly ignores Lukas and appears to only acknowledge Elias in conversation. Though it is the middle of summer, the mother orders the twins to keep the blinds closed during the day, imposes a strict rule of silence inside the house, and allows them to only play outdoors. The mother also acts cruel and lashes out at Elias physically when he displays mischievous or disobedient acts; something that the boys comment that their mother would never do.

The twins begin to suspect that beneath her bandages, their mother may not be the same person. These doubts are confirmed when they find an old picture that shows the mother together with another unknown woman who is wearing identical clothes and shares similar physical traits. With the suspicion that the woman residing in their house is an impostor, the twins tie the woman to the bed and refuse to let her go until she tells them where their real mother is. The woman insists that she is their mother, and the twins seal her mouth with tape to keep her from screaming for help.

In the meantime, two employees of the Red Cross appear to collect donations. Although they initially await the return of the mother, they finally leave the house after receiving a large cash amount from Elias, which he discreetly stole from his mother's purse. Meanwhile, the woman removes the tape and yells for help, but is too late to attract the Red Cross employees' attention. The twins seal her lips with Super Glue, only to cut them open with scissors when they realize she is unable to eat.

While still bound and trapped, the woman wets her bed. The twins briefly free her, allowing her to subdue the boys and escape. The twins, however, have set up a booby trap that knocks her unconscious. The woman wakes glued to the living room floor. Elias starts to burn down the house to pressure her into telling them the truth about their mother, but she firmly insists that she is the twins' real mother.

It is revealed by the mother that Lukas has died in an accident prior to the events of the movie. She tearfully explains to Elias that Lukas's death was not his fault and she begs her son to set her free so they can both move on from the tragedy. Elias challenges her to prove that she is their mother by telling them what Lukas is doing. As she cannot see the hallucinated Lukas threatening to set fire to a curtain, she cannot answer the question. Elias - believing that his real mother would be able to see Lukas - grabs his arm and lights up the curtain. The mother subsequently burns to death before the firefighters arrive. The film ends with a ghostly shot of the mother reunited with her twin sons at a cornfield near their home.

Cast
 Susanne Wuest as Mother
 Elias Schwarz as Elias
 Lukas Schwarz as Lukas
 Hans Escher as Priester
 Elfriede Schatz as Rotkreuz Sammlerin
 Karl Purker as Rotkreuz Sammler
 Georg Deliovsky as Pizzalieferant
 Christian Steindl as Mesner
 Christian Schatz as Bauer
 Erwin Schmalzbauer as Akkordeongott

Reception
The film generally received positive reviews from critics. On Rotten Tomatoes, the film has a rating of 85%, based on 145 reviews. The site's consensus reads: "Dark, violent, and drenched in dread, Goodnight Mommy is perfect for extreme horror enthusiasts -- or filmgoers who prefer to watch between splayed fingers." On Metacritic, the film has a score of 81 out of 100, based on 19 critics, indicating "universal acclaim".

The National Board of Review named Goodnight Mommy one of the Top 5 Foreign Language Films of 2015.

See also
The Other (1972 film), a psychological thriller with similar themes
The Good Son (film), a psychological thriller with related themes
A Tale of Two Sisters, a South Korean psychological horror-drama
The Uninvited (2009 film), American remake of A Tale of Two Sisters.
 List of submissions to the 88th Academy Awards for Best Foreign Language Film
 List of Austrian submissions for the Academy Award for Best Foreign Language Film

References

External links
 
 
 
 
 

2014 films
2014 horror thriller films
2014 psychological thriller films
2010s German-language films
2010s psychological horror films
Austrian horror thriller films
Films about dysfunctional families
Films about mother–son relationships
Films about twin brothers
Matricide in fiction
Works about plastic surgery